Pathit Pisitkul (also spelt Patit Pisitkul, born Sith Thantipisitkul), better known by his nickname Pai (ไผ่), is a Thai actor and singer. He is part of a band called Friend. He (Pisitkul) graduated from Thammasat University in Faculty of Commerce and Accountancy. Pisitkul is managed by Channel 7 (Thailand).

Filmography
 Goopai Huajai Waew (กู้ภัยหัวใจแหวว) (2012)
 Suphaburut Ban Thung (สุภาพบุรุษบ้านทุ่ง) (2013)
 Naksu Mahakan (นักสู้มหากาฬ) (2013)

Notes

References

1983 births
Living people
Pathit Pisitkul
Pathit Pisitkul
Pathit Pisitkul
Pathit Pisitkul
Pathit Pisitkul